Hellendoorn (Tweants: Heldern or Healndoorn) is a municipality and town in the middle of the Dutch province of Overijssel. As of 2019, the municipality had a population of 35,808.

There is an amusement park near the town of Hellendoorn called . At the outskirts of the town there is an ice cream factory from Unilever, where Ben & Jerry's is produced for the European market.

Population centres 
The municipality comprises:

Towns:
 Nijverdal (where the town hall is located)
 

Hamlets:
 Daarle
 Daarlerveen
 
 Egede
 
 
 
 
  (former hamlet, now an integrated part of Nijverdal)

Topography

Dutch topographic map of the municipality of Hellendoorn, June 2015

Geography 

The central part of the municipality consists of a hilly and sparsely populated area that extends south into the municipality of Rijssen-Holten, called the Sallandse Heuvelrug (Salland Ridge). A large chunk of the area is covered by forest, but there are also heathlands. This scenery is now part of the Sallandse Heuvelrug National Park.

Originally part of the region of Salland, Hellendoorn is now administratively considered part of Twente; a fact reflected in the inclusion of Hellendoorn in the city region of Twente (Kaderwetgebied Regio Twente) as defined by the Dutch government.

History 
The municipality of Hellendoorn is the only place in the Netherlands where gold mining took place.

The Germans operated a V-2 launching platform near the town of Hellendoorn during World War II, harassing the city of Antwerp.

On March, 22nd 1945, Nijverdal was severely bombed by allied bombers who were targeting the German Reichskommissar of Austrian origin Arthur Seyss-Inquart. Seyss-Inquart was fleeing the advancing Allied forces and had set up his temporary headquarters in the Reformed School in Nijverdal, but had already left town at the time of the bombing. Over 70 people were killed, mainly at the Grotestraat.

A small part of the film A Bridge Too Far was filmed near Hellendoorn.

In 1955, part of the municipality of Wierden was annexed (Eversberg, Konijnenbelt, Slettenhaar and Lochter) which is the only part of the municipality located on originally Twente soil. In the late-1970s the quarter of 'het Lochter' arose here.

Notable residents 
 Ernst Bakker (1946 in Hellendoorn – 2014) a Dutch politician
 Douwe Draaisma (born 1953 in Nijverdal) a Dutch psychologist and academic
 Herman Ponsteen (born 1953 in Hellendoorn) Dutch track cyclist who won silver at the 1976 Summer Olympics
 Derk van Egmond (born 1956 in Hellendoorn) a Dutch track cyclist, competed in the 1984 Summer Olympics
 Wim Woudsma (1957 in Nijverdal – 2019) a Dutch footballer with 395 club caps

Gallery

References

External links

 
Municipalities of Overijssel
Populated places in Overijssel
Salland
Twente